Ely is an unincorporated community located within Millstone Township in Monmouth County, New Jersey, United States. The settlement is named for the Ely family that owned property in the area and operated the Charleston Springs hotel. Today, the settlement is located along Stage Coach Road, County Route 524, in the eastern portion of the township. Most of the area consists of large single-family homes though some farmland and the township-owned Brandywine Soccer Complex are located in the near the settlement.

References

Millstone Township, New Jersey
Unincorporated communities in Monmouth County, New Jersey
Unincorporated communities in New Jersey